The 2021–22 SFA South Region Challenge Cup was the 15th edition of the annual knockout cup competition for senior non-league clubs in the central and southern regions of Scotland. The tournament entry increased from 142 to a record 161 teams thanks to additional clubs joining the East of Scotland Football League and West of Scotland Football League.

The defending champions were Dunipace, who beat Broomhill 3–1 in the delayed final of the 2019–20 edition on 15 August 2021. However they went out of the competition in the second round, losing 2–1 to Sauchie Juniors.

Auchinleck Talbot of the West of Scotland League lifted the trophy in their first season competing in the competition, beating Lowland League champions Bonnyrigg Rose Athletic 3–1 in the final.

Format
The South Challenge Cup featured 161 senior non-league clubs from the Lowland Football League (16), East of Scotland Football League (58), South of Scotland Football League (12), and West of Scotland Football League (75).The reserve teams of Stirling University, Caledonian Braves, and Stranraer, as well as Celtic B and Rangers B, do not take part. Heston Rovers and Westerton United withdrew from the competition and their respective leagues after the initial draw was made.

For the first time since 2015–16, the first and second rounds were regionalised, with north-east, south-east, south-west, and north-west sections each containing 40 or 41 clubs.

The draw was unseeded, with matches proceeding to extra time and penalties if they were tied after 90 minutes.

Calendar

First round
The draw for the regionalised first and second rounds took place on Friday 4 June 2021. Each zone features 8 fixtures in the first round with 24 clubs receiving a bye to the second round (except the South-East zone featuring 9 matches and 23 byes). Preston Athletic, Syngenta, and Tranent Juniors progressed to the second round after their opponents were unable to field a team.

North-East zone

South-East zone

South-West zone

North-West zone

Second round
The second round took place on the weekend of 16 October 2021, with 16 fixtures in each zone. Lugar Boswell Thistle and Renfrew received a bye to the third round after their opponents withdrew from the competition after the draw was made.

North-East zone

South-East zone

South-West zone

Replay

North-West zone

Third round
The third round took place on the weekend of 20 November 2021, reverting to an open draw with 32 fixtures to be played. The draw took place on 21 October 2021.

Fourth round
The fourth round took place on the weekend of 5 February 2022, however nine of the sixteen matches were postponed until the fifth round date. The draw took place on 20 December 2021 and was broadcast live on the Official Catchup YouTube channel.

Draw

Matches

Fifth round
The fifth round was scheduled to take place on the weekend of 5 March 2022.  Due to delays in completing the fourth round, the majority of ties were re-scheduled to later dates.

Draw
Teams in italics were unknown at the time of the draw. Teams in bold advanced to the quarter-finals.

Matches

Quarter-finals
The quarter-finals took place on the weekend of 2 April 2022.

Draw

Matches

Semi-finals
The semi-finals were both scheduled to take place on the weekend of 30 April 2022, however the match involving Bonnyrigg Rose was moved to 12 April due to their participation in the Pyramid play-off 2nd leg.

Draw

Matches

Final
The final of the TradeRadiators.com South Challenge Cup was played at the Falkirk Stadium on Sunday 22 May 2022, with a 3pm kick-off.

References

South
South Challenge Cup seasons